A diocese, also known as a bishopric, is an administrative unit under the supervision of a bishop, of which there are currently 8 in the Belgian Catholic Church. The 8 dioceses are divided into 1 ecclesiastical province and 7 suffragan dioceses, but also one military ordinariate, which was created a military vicariate in 1957, but elevated to a military ordinariate in 1986. Its seat is located at the Saint Jacques-sur-Coudenberg.

Since December 1961, following the restructuring of the Catholic dioceses in Belgium, the Archdiocese of Mechelen was renamed the Archdiocese of Mechelen-Brussels. This newly created archdiocese is the primatial see of Belgium and the centre of the ecclesiastical province governed by the Archdiocese of Mechelen-Brussels, which covers the whole of Belgium.

There are also a few former Roman Catholic dioceses in Belgium, including the Dioceses of Eupen-Malmedy and Ypres, but also the ancient Diocese of Thérouanne. The latter was split between the Dioceses of Saint-Omer, Boulogne and Ypres after the Council of Trent's reform of sees.

In Belgium, most dioceses coincide with a province, but there are a few exceptions.

List of Roman Catholic dioceses in Belgium

Ecclesiastical Province of Mechelen-Brussels

See also 
 List of Catholic churches in Belgium

External links 
Catholic-Hierarchy entry.
GCatholic.org.

References 

Belgium
Catholic dioceses